The Alchemy Index may refer to one of two parts of The Alchemy Index, a concept album by American rock band Thrice:
The Alchemy Index Vols. I & II (2007)
The Alchemy Index Vols. III & IV (2008)

Alchemy Index